Events from the year 1689 in China.

Incumbents 
 Kangxi Emperor (28th year)

Events 
 Sino-Russian border conflicts
 Resolved with the signing of the Treaty of Nerchinsk, the first treaty between Russia (Tsardom of Russia) and China (Great Qing Empire). The Russians gave up the area north of the Amur River as far as the Stanovoy Range and kept the area between the Argun River and Lake Baikal.

Births
 Jiao Bingzhen (1689–1726) was a native of Jining, Shandong who became a noted painter and astronomer. He is noteworthy as one of the first Qing dynasty painters to be influenced by the West

Deaths
 Zhang Dai (張岱; pinyin: Zhāng Dài, courtesy name: Zhongzhi (宗子), pseudonym: Tao'an (陶庵)) (1597–1684) a Ming Dynasty Chinese writer who was a gentleman essayist, a biographer of his own privileged aristocratic family, a historian of the Ming Dynasty, and a biographer of notable virtuous figures
 Yolo (岳樂; 1625–1689), Abatai's fourth son, held the title Prince An of the Second Rank from 1651 to 1654

References

 
 .

 
China